A Million in Prizes: The Anthology is a 2-disc greatest hits collection of the music of Iggy Pop, released in 2005. It supersedes the compilation Nude & Rude: The Best of Iggy Pop. The title comes from the lyrics of "Lust for Life". It contains previously unreleased live versions of "TV Eye" and "Loose", recorded during the tour in 1993.

As of 2014 it has sold 39,099 copies in United States according to Nielsen SoundScan.

Track listing

Disc 1
 "1969" – The Stooges
 "No Fun" – The Stooges
 "I Wanna Be Your Dog" – The Stooges
 "Down on the Street" – The Stooges
 "I Got a Right!" – Iggy & The Stooges
 "Gimme Some Skin" – Iggy & The Stooges
 "I'm Sick of You" – Iggy & The Stooges
 "Search and Destroy" – Iggy & The Stooges
 "Gimme Danger" – Iggy & The Stooges
 "Raw Power" – Iggy & The Stooges
 "Kill City" – Iggy Pop & James Williamson
 "Nightclubbing"
 "Funtime"
 "China Girl"
 "Sister Midnight"
 "Tonight"
 "Success"
 "Lust for Life"
 "The Passenger"

Tracks 1-3 from The Stooges (1969)
Track 4 from Fun House (1970)
Tracks 5-6 from "I Got a Right" single (1977)
Track 7 from "I'm Sick of You" EP (1977)
Tracks 8-10 from Raw Power (1973)
Track 11 from Kill City (recorded in 1975 but released two years later)
Tracks 12-15 from The Idiot (1977)
Tracks 16-19 from Lust for Life (1977)

Disc 2
 "Some Weird Sin"
 "I'm Bored"
 "I Need More"
 "Pleasure"
 "Run Like a Villain"
 "Cry for Love"
 "Real Wild Child (Wild One)"
 "Cold Metal"
 "Home"
 "Candy" – with Kate Pierson of The B-52's
 "Well Did You Evah!" – with Deborah Harry of Blondie
 "Wild America"
 "TV Eye" (Live)
 "Loose" (Live)
 "Look Away"
 "Corruption"
 "I Felt the Luxury" – with Medeski Martin & Wood
 "Mask"
 "Skull Ring" – Iggy & The Stooges

Track 1 from Lust for Life (1977)
Track 2 from New Values (1979)
Track 3 from Soldier (1980)
Track 4 from Party (1981)
Track 5 from Zombie Birdhouse (1982)
Tracks 6-7 from Blah Blah Blah (1986)
Track 8 from Instinct (1988)
Tracks 9-10 from Brick by Brick (1990)
Track 11 from Red Hot + Blue (1990)
Track 12 from  American Caesar (1993)
Track 13-14 from Live at the Feile Festival (1993)
Track 15 from Naughty Little Doggie (1996)
Tracks 16-17 from Avenue B (1999)
Track 18 from Beat 'Em Up (2001)
Track 19 from Skull Ring (2003)

Charts

Certifications

References 

2005 greatest hits albums
Iggy Pop compilation albums
Virgin Records compilation albums
Albums produced by James Williamson (musician)